The Quincy Canal was a small canal in Quincy, Massachusetts, that was built in the 1820s to haul freight in the city.

External links
Information on the construction of the canal

Buildings and structures in Quincy, Massachusetts
Quincy, Massachusetts